"2 Step" is the second single from Unk's album Beat'n Down Yo Block! It was released in 2007. It has an accompanying dance, called the "2 Step".  The video co-directed by Dale "Rage" Resteghini and Will Horton was released on February 23, 2007 on Yahoo! Music. The official remix has been made that features T-Pain, Jim Jones and E-40.

The song debuted on the Billboard Hot 100 at number 94 in February 2007 and peaked at number 24. It has also climbed to number 9 on Hot R&B/Hip-Hop Songs, and number 4 on Hot Rap Tracks.

Track listing 
 2 Step (Clean)
 2 Step (Explicit)
 2 Step (Instrumental)
 2 Step (A Cappella)
 Beat'n Down Yo Block (Clean)
 Beat'n Down Yo Block (Explicit)
 Beat'n Down Yo Block (Instrumental)
 Beat'n Down Yo Block (A Cappella)
Both a cappellas are Explicit.

Charts

Weekly charts

Year-end charts

References

External links

rrrt

2007 singles
Unk songs
2006 songs
Hip hop dance
MNRK Music Group singles
Music videos directed by Dale Resteghini